Hark is from a Middle English word "herken", meaning to listen carefully. It may refer to:

Geography
Hark, Byzantine name for the Muş Province area of Turkey
"The Hark" (Harkness Commons), a Gropius building on the Harvard Law School campus

Music

Albums
Hark (album), a 1985 album by clarinetist Buddy DeFranco, with the Oscar Peterson quartet
Hark! Songs for Christmas - Vol. II, a 2006 album by Sufjan Stevens
Hark! The Village Wait, a 1970 album by the folk rock band Steeleye Span
Hark!, a 1992 album by Richard Stoltzman
Hark! (The Doppelgangaz album), 2013
Hark! (Andrew Bird album), a 2020 album by Andrew Bird

Songs
"Hark! The Herald Angels Sing", Christmas carol by Charles Wesley
"Hark The Sound", the alma mater song of the University of North Carolina
"Hark", a song by Buddy DeFranco from the 1985 album Hark

People

Given name
Hark Bohm (born 1939), German actor and screenwriter
Hark Olufs (1708–1754), Frisian sailor

Surname
Lisa Hark, nutritionist and consultant for the BBC TV series, Honey, We're Killing the Kids
Sabine Hark (born 1962), German sociologist
Tsui Hark (born 1950), Hong Kong film director

Other uses
Hark At Barker, a 1969 British sitcom starring Ronnie Barker
 HARKing, Hypothesizing After the Results are Known, an error in research design
 Hark, a 2019 novel by author Sam Lipsyte

See also
Harke & Burr, fictional comic book characters
Harker (disambiguation)
Harkes, a surname
Harkness (disambiguation)